Joel Engel may refer to:

 Joel Engel (composer) (1868–1927), music critic, composer, and leading figure in the Jewish art music movement
 Joel S. Engel (born 1936), American engineer

See also
 Joel Engle (born 1968), American author, pastor, and Christian recording artist